Anne Sender (born 1 November 1956) is a Norwegian lecturer and debater.

She was born in Skien. Her books include Vår jødiske reise from 2013. She received the Fritt Ord Award in 2014.

Selected works

References

1956 births
Living people
People from Skien
Norwegian non-fiction writers
Norwegian women non-fiction writers
Norwegian Jews
Converts to Judaism